John McNamara was an Australian politician.

He was a merchant and shipowner. From 1856 to 1859 he was a member of the New South Wales Legislative Council.

References

Year of birth unknown
Year of death missing
Members of the New South Wales Legislative Council